Rainbow Boulevard is a main roadway located in southeastern Wyandotte County and northeastern Johnson County, Kansas. It runs north–south.

Its northern terminus is just south of Interstate 35 at Southwest Boulevard in Kansas City, Kansas. Its southern terminus at Shawnee Mission Parkway in Mission Woods, Kansas.

Highway route

Current Highways
  U.S. Route 169 - US 169 has always existed along Rainbow Boulevard since its commissioning. It continues south from the 7th Street Trafficway, the name of Rainbow north of Southwest Blvd., and follows the entire length of Rainbow to Shawnee Mission Parkway, where it duplexes with U.S. Route 56 and heads west.

Cities traversed
Kansas City, Kansas
Westwood, Kansas
Westwood Hills, Kansas
Mission Woods, Kansas

References

Transportation in Wyandotte County, Kansas
Transportation in Johnson County, Kansas
Transportation in the Kansas City metropolitan area
Roads in Kansas